Shraga Goren (born Shraga Gorohovsky in 1898, died 12 June 1972) was an Israeli politician.

Biography
Born in Makariv in the Russian Empire (today in Ukraine), Goren studied in a heder and a high school in Kyiv. He also attended the University of Kyiv, but did not finish his studies. In 1913 he joined Tzeiri Zion, and the following year became a member of the Time to Build commune. In 1917 he was one of the founding members of Dror. He also joined the Jewish Legion.

In 1921 he made aliyah to Mandatory Palestine, where he was amongst the founders of Tel Aviv's first planning group. He worked in the Office of Public Works and Building, and became one of the heads of the Solel Boneh construction company. Between 1924 and 1929 he served as chairman of the transportation co-operative and of the co-operatives centre.

In 1949 he was elected to the first Knesset on the Mapai list, and served on the Economic Affairs committee and the Labour committee. He lost his seat in the 1951 elections.

He died on 12 June 1972.

Biography
 

1898 births
1972 deaths
Ukrainian Jews
Israeli Jews
Jews from the Russian Empire
Soviet emigrants to Mandatory Palestine
Members of the 1st Knesset (1949–1951)
Mapai politicians